Bonnechere Provincial Park is an Ontario provincial park located on Round Lake in Renfrew County, Ontario, Canada. 

Designated as recreational-class by Ontario Parks, it has 128 campsites, 4 rustic cabins and a day use area, which includes a shower station, playground and a beach.

Gallery

See also
List of Ontario parks

References

External links

Friends of Bonnechere Park

Parks in Renfrew County
Provincial parks of Ontario
Protected areas established in 1967
1967 establishments in Ontario